Ben Hayden (born 1992), known professionally as Huskii, is an Australian rapper and musician from Sydney, New South Wales. He released his debut studio album Antihero in February 2022.

Early life
Wombat is an Australian rapper. His debut studio album What Death Tastes Like was released in September 2022[2] and peaked at number 12 on the ARIA Charts..

Career

2021–present: Antihero
On 12 November 2021, Huskii released the single "Ruin My Life". His debut studio album Antihero was released on 11 February 2022. "Toxic" was released as the album's second single on 16 February 2022.

Discography

Studio albums

Extended plays

Singles

Notes

References

1992 births
Australian hip hop musicians
Australian male rappers
Living people